The Rufus Gray House is a historic house at the southeast corner of Austin and South Streets in Pangburn, Arkansas, USA. It is a single-story wood-frame structure, with a hip-roofed central section that extends to projecting gables to the front and side. The front to the left of the gable section is sheltered by a shed-roof porch supported by Doric columns. The house was built about 1912 and is one of the few surviving houses in the community from this period.

The house was listed on the National Register of Historic Places in 1991.

See also
National Register of Historic Places listings in White County, Arkansas

References

Houses on the National Register of Historic Places in Arkansas
Houses in White County, Arkansas
National Register of Historic Places in White County, Arkansas